Bi Xiaolin (born 18 September 1989) is a Chinese footballer currently playing as a goalkeeper for Dalian Quanjian.

Career statistics

International

References

1989 births
Living people
Chinese women's footballers
China women's international footballers
Women's association football goalkeepers
Dalian Quanjian F.C. players
2019 FIFA Women's World Cup players
Footballers at the 2018 Asian Games
Asian Games silver medalists for China
Asian Games medalists in football
Medalists at the 2018 Asian Games